Stephen Kasner (April 3, 1970 – December 25, 2019) was an American multidisciplinary artist from Cleveland, Ohio, United States. Primarily a painter and illustrator but also a musician, photographer, graphic artist, occultist and magician; Kasner was mainly known through his cover artwork designs for bands such as Rotting Christ, Decrepit, Sunn O))), Integrity, Marduk, & Pulling Teeth among many others.

His paintings have been exhibited all over the world and are noted for their sinister (sometimes satanic) themes and otherworldly aesthetic; influencing a new wave of artists in the dark arts. His artwork, drawings and photographs usually reflect visions of a pre/post-apocalyptic industrial landscape and the struggle for survival contained in dreams of enlightenment.

Besides working in paint, photography, and drawings Stephen Kasner also created experimental music under the name Blood Fountains, where he performed on guitars, bass, and keyboards.

He did album artwork for Khlyst, Sunn O))), Integrity, Lotus Eaters, Skullflower, Justin Broadrick, Subarachnoid Space and Martin Grech, among many others.

Kasner released the book Stephen Kasner Works: 1993 – 2006 (Scapegoat Publishing, 2007), a lavish career retrospective with text by various artistic luminaries and collaborations with Seldon Hunt, David D'Andrea, Dwid Hellion, Steven Leyba, and Steven Cerio.

Stephen Kasner died on December 25, 2019. His longtime friend and fellow Cleveland native, Dwid, from the band Integrity (for which Kasner had provided artwork) posted through Twitter in homage: "Stephen Kasner was my friend. He will be deeply missed. I hope that his artwork will remind us of his tortured brilliance and haunted vision. May his death serve as a stark reminder of how fragile we can be. To those of you who may be struggling out there, who might feel alone. You are not alone. Stay strong."

References

External links
Official website

20th-century American painters
American male painters
21st-century American painters
American male musicians
Horror artists
Musicians from Cleveland
1970 births
2019 deaths
20th-century American male artists